An SMS gateway or MMS gateway allows a computer (also known as a Server) to send or receive text messages in the form of Short Message Service (SMS) or Multimedia Messaging Service (MMS) transmissions between local and/or international telecommunications networks. In most cases, SMS and MMS are eventually routed to a mobile phone through a wireless carrier. SMS gateways are commonly used as a method for person-to-person to device-to-person (also known as application-to-person) communications. Many SMS gateways support content and media conversions from email, push, voice, and other formats.

Gateway types
Several mobile telephone network operators have true fixed-wire SMS services. These are based on extensions to the European Telecommunications Standards Institute (ETSI) Global System for Mobile Communications (GSM) SMS standards and allow messaging between any mix of fixed and mobile equipment. These use frequency-shift keying to transfer the message between the terminal and the Short Message Service Center (SMSC). Terminals are usually based on Digital Enhanced Cordless Telecommunications (DECT), but wired handsets and wired text-only (no voice) devices exist.  Messages are received by the terminal recognising that the Caller ID is that of the SMSC and going off-hook silently to receive the message.

Implementations

GSM gateway appliance
A direct-to-mobile gateway is a device that has built-in wireless GSM connectivity. It allows SMS text messages to be sent and/or received by email, from Web pages or from other software applications by acquiring a unique identifier from the mobile phone's Subscriber Identity Module, or "SIM card". Direct-to-mobile gateways are different from SMS aggregators because they are installed on an organization's own network and connect to a local mobile network.

The connection to the mobile network is made by acquiring a SIM card number from the mobile operator and installing it in the gateway. Typically, direct-to-mobile gateway appliances are used for hundreds to thousands of text messages per month. More modern appliances now offer the capability of send up to 100,000 messages each day. Several vendors that have historically provided GSM Gateway equipment for voice also have SMS capability. Some are more primitive than others. The more capable devices are designed with SIM management to regulate the number of SMS messages per SIM, ODBC to connect to a database, and HTTP interfaces to interact with third-party applications.

Regulation
GSM gateway equipment is covered by the Wireless Telegraphy Act in the UK and can legally be used by any business to send SMS to their own customers or prospects when using their own gateway equipment. In Canada, SMS gateway providers are regulated by the Canadian Wireless Telecommunications Association (CWTA/txt.ca).
In India, it is regulated by the Telecom Regulatory Authority of India (TRAI).
In Pakistan, it is regulated by the Pakistan Telecommunication Authority(PTA).

Direct-to-SMSC
A direct-to-short message service centre (SMSC) gateway is a software application, or a component within a software application, that connects directly to a mobile operator's SMSC via the Internet or direct leased line connections. The Short Message Peer-to-Peer (SMPP) protocol is typically used to convey SMS between an application and the SMSC. Direct-to-SMSC gateways are used by SMS aggregators to provide SMS services to their clients and large businesses who can justify such use. They are typically employed for high volume messaging and require a contract directly with a mobile operator.

Direct-to-SMS gateway
An SMS gateway typically sits between the end-user who needs to send/receive SMS and a mobile network's SMSC. Such gateways provide their customers with a choice of protocols, including HTTP, SMTP, Short Message Peer-to-Peer and Web Services. Providers of SMS gateway services include SMS aggregators and mobile operators. SMS gateways are also available as part of messaging services such as AOL, ICQ and others.

In order to send/receive messages with mobile subscribers, an SMS gateway connects with (i) mobile network SMSCs and/or (ii) other SMS gateways. It is, therefore, possible that an SMS gateway has a combination of connections with mobile network SMSCs and connections with other SMS gateways in order to provide its services. However, there is the increasing potential for delivery problems with SMS the greater the number of SMS gateways in the delivery chain.

Email clients
Text messages can be sent from a personal computer to mobile devices via an SMS gateway or Multimedia Messaging Service (MMS) gateway, using the most popular email client programs, such as Outlook, Thunderbird, and so on.  The messages must be sent in ASCII "text-only" mode.  If they are sent in HTML mode or using non-ASCII characters, they will most likely appear as nonsense on the recipient's mobile telephone.

Before the message can be sent, one must determine the domain of the mobile carrier's SMS gateway.  For example, if one wanted to send a message to a mobile telephone in the United States serviced by AT&T, and the telephone number is +1 415-123-4567, the email would be addressed as

4151234567@txt.att.net

To determine the SMS gateway domain, e.g., txt.att.net, may require research - but most users know who their carrier is.  Observe that the telephone number in this example for a US number is expressed as ten (10) digits, without the country code (1) and without dashes or other separator characters when composing the email address.  The country code is not needed, as the 10-digit telephone number, together with the email domain, are sufficient to send the email from any location in the world.

It is useful to perform a character count before sending the message to ensure that it is within the 160-character limit.  If it exceeds the limit, the SMS gateway should break the message into a set of consecutive 160-character, or shorter, messages to the mobile equipment, although the breaks may occur in the middle of words.

A message sent with an email client can be simultaneously addressed to multiple mobile telephones - just as text messages sent in the usual manner between mobile telephones can be sent to multiple recipients.

SMS gateway domains for other carriers (US-based):

SMS gateway domains for Canadian carriers:

SMS gateway features 
There are several applications for SMS gateways, including:
 Bulk/mass SMS messaging communications commonly used for customer care to marketing campaigns
 Two-way SMS messaging, designed for the exchange of messages from clients to a customer portal
 To enable the development of an SMS widget for newsletters and updates
 API allowing systems to integrate with 3rd party systems including common CRM, e-commerce, ERP, and internal platforms
For multi-factor authentication or two-factor authentication using SMS as a channel for delivering one-time-passwords (OTPs)

See also
 Kannel (telecommunications)
 Videoconferencing
 Voice over IP

References

Mobile telecommunications
Text messaging